The 2018 Liga 3 Jogjakarta is a qualifying round for the national round of 2018 Liga 3. Satria Adhikarta, the winner of the 2017 Liga 3 Jogjakarta are the defending champions but the team did not participate in this year's competition. The competition will begin on June 27, 2018.

Group stage 
The 9 probable teams to compete are mentioned below.
This stage scheduled starts on 27 Jule 2018.

Group A

Group B

References 

 

Liga Nusantara
3